Abades is a municipality of the province of Segovia, located in the Spanish autonomous region of Castile and León. It also forms part of the territory known as the Campiña Segoviana. According to the 2019 census (INE), the municipality has a population of 848 inhabitants.

References  

Municipalities in the Province of Segovia